The Now is an American comedy series, directed by Peter and Bobby Farrelly. It stars Dave Franco, O'Shea Jackson Jr., Daryl Hannah and Jimmy Tatro. It was originally set to debut in 2020 on Quibi, but it moved to The Roku Channel due to Quibi's shutdown in December 2020. It premiered on The Roku Channel on December 10, 2021.

Premise
A secret from Ed Poole's past has seemingly destroyed his future, the only thing to make his life worth living is to forget the past and live in The Now.

Cast and characters

Main
 Dave Franco as Ed Poole
 O'Shea Jackson Jr. as Coop
 Daryl Hannah as Maxine Poole
 Jimmy Tatro as Hal

Recurring
 Alyssa Milano as Sarah
 Lex Scott Davis as Kendra
 Rob Yang as Joon-Ho
 Bill Murray as Dr. Robert Flaherty
Pete Davidson as Adam

Episodes

Production

Development
In July 2019, it was announced Peter Farrelly would direct the series, from a screenplay by Farrelly, Steve Laff and Pete Jones, with Anonymous Content producing the series for Quibi. In October 2019, Bobby Farrelly was announced to co-direct the series.

Casting
In October 2019, Dave Franco joined the cast of the series. In November 2019, O'Shea Jackson Jr., Daryl Hannah, Jimmy Tatro joined the cast as series regulars, while Alyssa Milano, Lex Scott Davis, Rob Yang, and Bill Murray joined in recurring capacity.

Release
On October 21, 2020, it was announced that Quibi would be shutting down all operations, leaving the series' release in question. On October 29, 2020, it was announced that development of the series would move to The Roku Channel. The series premiered on The Roku Channel on December 10, 2021.

References

External links
 

Roku original programming
American comedy web series